Shrimp paste fried rice can refer to:

Bagoong fried rice, shrimp paste fried rice in Filipino cuisine
Khao khluk kapi (ข้าวคลุกกะปิ), shrimp paste fried rice in Thai cuisine